Wednesbury Great Western Street is a tram stop in Wednesbury, Sandwell, England. It was opened on 31 May 1999 and is situated on Midland Metro Line 1. The stop is next to the Midland Metro tram depot.

The stop and depot are on the site of the old Wednesbury Central railway station, which closed in 1972, though the section of railway on which the tram stop currently stands remained open to goods trains until 1992.

The stop is overlooked by a statue of Sleipnir, Odin's mythical eight-legged horse, by Steve Field, commissioned by Altram, the company that built the metro.

Services
Mondays to Fridays, Midland Metro services in each direction between Birmingham and Wolverhampton run at six to eight-minute intervals during the day, and at fifteen-minute intervals during the evenings and on Sundays. They run at eight minute intervals on Saturdays.

South Staffordshire Line
The South Staffordshire Line which is currently closed, is crossed over by the Midland Metro. Wednesbury Great Western will also be the start of the Wednesbury - Brierley Hill Extension which will utilize the railway line to the former station sites at Great Bridge North railway station, Dudley Port railway station, Dudley railway station before running through Dudley town centre and will reconnect to the line at Canal Street before finally leaving the line around Harts Hill railway station, towards Merry Hill Shopping Centre and Brierley Hill.

This line may also be used by heavy rail between Walsall and it will run the entire track to Round Oak. This could make it the second Midland Metro scheme to share a trackbed with heavy rail. With the other being the shared trackbed between The Hawthorns and Birmingham Snow Hill railway station. There is also potential for a tram service between Wolverhampton and Wednesbury, via Walsall, which would use the line between Walsall railway station and the former Wednesbury Town railway station, along with the majority of the Wolverhampton and Walsall Railway. Transport for West Midlands are currently undertaking a feasibility scheme into the possibility of a metro extension to Stourbridge, with stops at Brockmoor, Brettell Lane railway station, Amblecote, Stourbridge Junction and Stourbridge Town.

A short walk away is the site of another former railway line which served the former Patent Shaft steel works and continued through Darlaston.  The distinct GWR goods sheds are still standing.

References

External links

 Article on this Metro stop from Rail Around Birmingham & the West Midlands
 Article on this stop from Thetrams

West Midlands Metro stops
Transport in Sandwell
Railway stations in Great Britain opened in 1999